The Eudora Welty House at 1119 Pinehurst Street in Jackson, Mississippi was the home of author Eudora Welty for nearly 80 years. It was built by her parents in 1925. In it she did all her writing, in an upstairs bedroom.  Welty and her mother built and tended the garden over decades.  The house was first declared a Mississippi Landmark in 2001, added to the National Register of Historic Places in 2002, and declared a National Historic Landmark in 2004.  This was part of a raised awareness of the significance of authors and literary life in the United States.

The house was restored by the Eudora Welty Foundation and the Mississippi Department of Archives and History.  In 2006 the house and garden were opened to the public as an author's house museum.  The renovation of the house and garden is part of a larger effort to celebrate and promote Mississippi's literary heritage as a means of developing tourism to the state. In 2009, the Education and Visitors Center was opened next door at 1109 Pinehurst Street. There, visitors can purchase tickets to tour the Welty House, see a selection of Welty's literary awards, and explore exhibits based on the author's memoir, One Writer's Beginnings.

Tours of the Eudora Welty House & Garden are given Tuesday - Friday, four times a day at 9 a.m., 11 a.m., 1 p.m., and 3 p.m. and at 1 and 3 p.m. on Saturdays. The Education and Visitors Center and Gift Shop are open Tuesday - Friday from 8:30 a.m. to 5 p.m. and on Saturdays from 12:30 to 5 p.m.

Garden 
This garden was designed by Chestina Welty, Eudora Welty's mother, in 1925. The garden was often referred to by Eudora and her mother as a labor of love. It is located in the back of Eudora Welty's home and is a popular tourist attraction. Visitors are able to tour come and explore the vast amount of different types of flowers growing in the garden. The garden has a rose garden section, woodland garden section and a camellia flower collection. Chestina Welty put enormous effort into the design of the garden, creating a "succession of bloom" throughout the entire year. For example, over 40 varieties of camellias bloom in the garden throughout the winter months. In the summer, night-blooming cereus plants bloom on the side porch. In The Golden Apples, called the cereus “a naked, luminous, complicated flower.” Many of the flowers in this garden appear in Eudora Welty's stories and novels. Welty also wrote extensively about the garden in her letters.

See also
List of National Historic Landmarks in Mississippi
National Register of Historic Places listings in Hinds County, Mississippi

References

External links

Eudora Welty House & Garden
Eudora Welty House at the Eudora Welty Foundation's website

National Historic Landmarks in Mississippi
Houses in Jackson, Mississippi
Houses completed in 1925
Historic house museums in Mississippi
Museums established in 2006
Welty
Museums in Jackson, Mississippi
Welty, Eudora
Women's museums in the United States
Mississippi Landmarks
National Register of Historic Places in Jackson, Mississippi